Muk may refer to:
 Muk (food), a type of jelly found in Korean cuisine
 Muk (Pokémon), a poison-type Pokémon
 Muk-chi-ba, a variant of the two-player game rock-paper-scissors
 Motorsport UK, governing body of four-wheel motorsport in the UK

People 
Muk (Korean name), a Korean family name
 Petr Muk (1965–2010), Czech pop musician, composer and performer

Places 
 Muk, Iran (disambiguation)
 Muk, Tajikistan
 Muk-dong, a dong, neighbourhood of Jungnang-gu in Seoul, South Korea
 Mukilteo, Washington, often referred to as "Muk" by its inhabitants.
 IATA Code for Mauke Airport, at Ma'uke Island, in the Cook Islands

See also 
 
 Mucc, a Japanese rock band
 Muck (disambiguation)